Mount Kuring-gai is an outer suburb of Northern Sydney, in the state of New South Wales, Australia. Mount Kuring-gai is located 31 kilometres north-west of the Sydney central business district, in the local government area of Hornsby Shire.

History 

The name "Kuring-gai" derives from the Guringai Aboriginal people who were thought to be the traditional owners of the area. More contemporary research suggests that this was not the case.

The railway station opened on 5 October 1901 and was named Kuring-gai. The current station was constructed in 1909. The Mount was added to the name on 1 August 1904.

Kuring-gai Post Office opened on 27 January 1908 and was similarly renamed Mount Kuring-gai in 1933.

Mount Kuring-gai Public School opened in 1957.

Population 
In the 2016 Census, there were 1,708 people in Mount Kuring-Gai. 73.9% of people were born in Australia and 83.0% of people spoke only English at home. The most common responses for religion were No Religion 30.1%, Anglican 19.0% and Catholic 18.3%.

Commercial areas and transport 
The suburb is divided in two by the Pacific Highway, Main Northern railway line and the Pacific Motorway. The suburb is served by the Mount Kuring-gai railway station.

The eastern side is home to a primary school, community hall and sports oval. The western side has a shopping centre, Mount Kuring-gai railway station and a Telstra telephone exchange.  The east and west sides are connected by a road bridge and a pedestrian bridge.

In 2010, the existing shopping centre was demolished and an Aldi store was built in its place, along with a variety of other stores.

Mount Kuring-gai also has an industrial area which is home to many diverse businesses such as a hot air balloon manufacturer, electronics companies, a school paint manufacturer, a book publisher and one bus depot of Transdev NSW.

Geography 
Mount Kuring-gai is located approximately 7 km north of Hornsby. Its neighbouring suburbs are Berowra to the north, and Mount Colah to the south. Surrounded by bushland, it is bordered by Ku-ring-gai Chase National Park on the eastern side and by Berowra Valley Regional Park on the western side.  There are several bushwalks starting in the suburb including the Great North Walk and a path to Apple Tree Bay. Mount Kuring-gai varies in altitude from about 57 m to 214–221 m above sea level.

See also 
 Dangar Island
 Hawkesbury River Railway Bridge
 Hawkesbury River
 Ku-ring-gai Chase National Park

Notes

References 
 The Book of Sydney Suburbs, Compiled by Frances Pollen, Angus & Robertson Publishers, 1990, Published in Australia

External links
  [CC-By-SA]

Suburbs of Sydney
Hornsby Shire